, son of regent Ietsune, was a kugyō or Japanese court noble of the Kamakura period (1185–1333). Uchitsune was his son who he had with a daughter of Ichijō Sanetsune. One of his daughter was a consort of Takatsukasa Fuyunori.

Family
 Father: Ichijo Ietsune
 Mother: Matsudono Yoshitsugu’s daughter
 Wife: daughter of Ichijo Sanetsune
 Children:
 Ichijo Uchitsune by daughter of Ichijo Ietsune
 daughter married Takatsukasa Fuyunori

References
 

1276 births
1304 deaths
Fujiwara clan
Ichijō family